An anonymizer or an anonymous proxy is a tool that attempts to make activity on the Internet untraceable. It is a proxy server computer that acts as an intermediary and privacy shield between a client computer and the rest of the Internet. It accesses the Internet on the user's behalf, protecting personal information of the user by hiding the client computer's identifying information. Anonymous proxy is the opposite of transparent proxy, which sends user information in the connection request header.

Purposes

There are many reasons for using anonymizers, such as minimizing risk, prevention of identity theft, or protecting search histories from public disclosure.

Some countries apply heavy censorship on the internet. Anonymizers can help to allow free access to all of the internet content, but they cannot help against persecution for accessing the anonymizer website itself. Furthermore, as information itself about anonymizer websites are banned in those countries, users are wary that they may be falling into a government-set trap.

Anonymizers are also used by people who wish to receive objective information with the growing target marketing on the internet and targeted information. For example, large news outlets such as CNN target the viewers according to region and give different information to different populations. Websites such as YouTube obtain information about the last videos viewed on a computer, and they propose "recommended" videos accordingly, and most of the online targeted marketing is done by showing advertisements according to that region. Anonymizers are used for avoiding that kind of targeting and getting a more objective view of information.

For building a reliable anonymous system, anonymous proxy signatures are helpful. It can be used in anonymous voting or other authentication processes that value anonymity.

Types of anonymizers

Protocol-specific anonymizers

Sometimes anonymizers are implemented to work only with one particular protocol. The advantage is that no extra software is needed. The operation occurs in this manner: a connection is made by the user to the anonymizer. Commands to the anonymizer are included inside a typical message. The anonymizer then makes a connection to the resource specified by the inbound command and relays the message with the command stripped out.

An example of a protocol-specific anonymizer is an anonymous remailer for e-mail. Also of note are web proxies and bouncers for FTP and IRC. Potentially anonymity integrated with RFID tags could pose as an option.

Protocol-independent anonymizers

Protocol independence can be achieved by creating a tunnel to an anonymizer. There are various technologies to do so. Protocols used by anonymizer services may include SOCKS, PPTP, or OpenVPN.

In this case either the desired application must support the tunneling protocol, or a piece of software must be installed to force all connections through the tunnel. Web browsers, FTP and IRC clients often support SOCKS for example, unlike telnet.

Use of multiple relays

Proxies can be daisy chained. Chaining anonymous proxies can make traffic analysis far more complex and costly by requiring the eavesdropper to be able to monitor different parts of the Internet. An anonymizing remailer can use this concept by relaying a message to another remailer, and eventually to its destination.

Even stronger anonymity can be gained by using Tor. Tor is not merely a proxy chain, but an onion router, which means that routing information (as well as message content) is encrypted in such a way as to prevent linking the origin and destination. Like all anonymity networks, Tor cannot end-to-end encrypt messages destined for the public internet; it must be arranged between the sender and recipient. Tor's onion service protocol does, however, provide end-to-end encryption, along with the ability to anonymize servers, making them more censorship-resistant.

Another anonymity network is the Invisible Internet Project (I2P). Unlike Tor, I2P is a fully internal network. The philosophy behind I2P is that each node routes traffic for others and blends its own traffic in, whereas one's own traffic will be relayed by other peers through so-called tunnels made up of various other peers. As you never know if a given mix logs all connections or not, the only way to be really sure there is no logging is to run your own anonymizing mix node and blend your traffic with those of other users. These other users do not need to trust you, as they blend their traffic with yours and other users' traffic in their own mix nodes. The network is highly dynamic and fully decentralized. It also takes care of other nodes learning about your node existing, for without peers using your node, there would be no traffic to blend yours with. As all traffic always stays within the I2P network, a routing user's I2P can remain end-to-end encrypted and will never show on public websites' logs.

Examples
Examples of anonymizer websites include Anonymouse, Anonymiz.com, Anonymize, Anonymizer, IDZap, Ultimate Anonymity, The Cloak and GhostSurf Platinum.

See also

Anonymous P2P
Anonymization
Anonymous web browsing
CGIProxy, web based proxy Perl script often used as anonymizer solution,
I2P - the invisible internet project
Java Anon Proxy - a proxy system designed to allow browsing the Web with revocable pseudonymity.
Geo-blocking
Open proxy
Tor (network)

References

Anonymity